The doubles competition in luge at the 2022 Winter Olympics was held on 9 February, at the Xiaohaituo Bobsleigh and Luge Track in Yanqing District. Tobias Wendl and Tobias Arlt of Germany, the 2014 and 2018 champions, won the event again. The 2018 bronze medalists, Toni Eggert and Sascha Benecken, won the silver medal. Thomas Steu and Lorenz Koller of Austria won the bronze, their first medal.

The 2018 silver medalists, Peter Penz and Georg Fischler, retired from competitions. Eggert and Benneken were leading the 2021–22 Luge World Cup before the Olympics, with Wendl and Arlt second. The two pairs were considered to be the prime gold contenders. Andris Šics and Juris Šics, the bronze medalists of the 2014 Olympics, were consistent though the 2021/2022 season and were standing third in the World Cup before the Olympics. In the race, they finished fifth.

Qualification

The qualification is based on the cumulative points of the Olympic Season from 1 July 2021 to January 10, 2022. A total of 36 (18 pairs) quota spots are available to athletes to compete at the games. Each NOC can enter a maximum of three athletes.

In the doubles, all nations with a pair in the top 25 qualified one slot. If there were remaining spots left, the second best sled of each nation in the top 28 was awarded an additional quota, if there were any remaining spots.

On December 17, 2021, the International Luge Federation announced that the qualification system was changed. The qualification system was changed due to training runs being cancelled at the first World Cup, and equipment not being delivered to the following World Cups. The new system saw athletes qualify based on their top four results during the World Cup season, (as opposed to the previous all seven results counting).

On January 19, 2022 the International Luge Federation announced the list of qualified athletes.

Summary

Results
The second qualified sled from Austria did not start.

References

Luge at the 2022 Winter Olympics
Men's events at the 2022 Winter Olympics